The scarlet-collared flowerpecker (Dicaeum retrocinctum) is a species of bird in the family Dicaeidae, about 10 cm long and is endemic to the Philippines.

It is found only in Mindoro, usually occurring below 1000m in the canopy and edge of the forest and in open country with scattered trees. The call is a series of notes similar to striking two stones together plus a high-pitched `zeet zeet zeet`. It is closely related to the red-keeled flowerpecker (Dicaeum australe) but has a longer, more slender curved beak.

Description 
EBird describes the bird as "A small bird of lowland and foothill forest and more open wooded areas on Mindoro, slightly glossy black with a white belly and sides of the chest and with red patches on the throat, upper back, and in a stripe from the center of the chest down the belly. Note the fairly long, thin, slightly curved bill. Similar to Pygmy Flowerpecker, but has a black chest and red patches. Gives a high-pitched, staccato, rather jumbled song.”

It is seen feeding on flowering and fruiting trees.

Habitat and Conservation Status 
It inhabits tropical moist lowland forest up to 1,000 meters above sea level. It prefers primary forest and secondary forest but has been known to visit cultivations and coconut plantations

IUCN has assessed this bird as vulnerable with its population being estimated as 6,000 to 15,000 mature individuals. Forest loss is a threat especially in its lower altitude limits which are more prone to legal and illegal logging, mining and conversion into farmland.

It occurs on a few protected areas Mt Siburan (Important Bird Area) and Mt. Iglit-baco National Park (which is the stronghold of the Tamaraw).. 

Conservation actions proposed include to establish formal, managed protected areas to conserve remnant forest at Malpalon and Puerto Galera. Extend Mt Iglit-Baco National Park to encompass remaining lowland forest tracts. Devise and implement a management plan for the forest at Mt. Siburan with a focus on biodiversity conservation

References

External links
BirdLife Species Factsheet.

scarlet-collared flowerpecker
Birds of Mindoro
scarlet-collared flowerpecker
Taxonomy articles created by Polbot